Michael Francis Easley Jr. (born 1985) is an American lawyer who is the United States attorney for the Eastern District of North Carolina. He is the son of former North Carolina Governor Mike Easley and former North Carolina First Lady Mary P. Easley.

Education

Easley received his Bachelor of Arts, with honors and distinction, from the University of North Carolina at Chapel Hill in 2007 and his Juris Doctor, with honors, from the University of North Carolina School of Law in 2010.

Career
From 2010 to 2021, he was a litigation partner at the law firm of McGuireWoods. His practice focused on government investigations and a range of civil and criminal matters in both state and federal courts.

Easley was a member of the Criminal Justice Act Panel for the Eastern District of North Carolina, through which he provided legal representation to indigent clients under federal indictment or investigation. He served as a council member for the Criminal Justice Section of the North Carolina Bar Association and as a member of the Board of Visitors of the University of North Carolina. He previously served on the Board of Directors for North Carolina's Tenth Judicial District Bar and the Wake County Bar Association.

U.S. attorney for the Eastern District of North Carolina 
On September 28, 2021, President Joe Biden nominated Easley to be the United States attorney for the Eastern District of North Carolina. On October 28, 2021, his nomination was reported out of committee by a voice vote. On November 17, 2021, his nomination was confirmed in the United States Senate by voice vote. He was sworn in on November 26, 2021, by Judge James C. Dever III.

Personal life 
Easley is the son of former North Carolina Governor Mike Easley and former First Lady Mary P. Easley. He was raised in the Roman Catholic faith and is of Irish and Greek descent.

References

External links
 Biography at U.S. Department of Justice

1985 births
Living people
21st-century American lawyers
American people of Irish descent
American people of Greek descent
American Roman Catholics
Catholics from North Carolina
Michael
McGuireWoods people
North Carolina lawyers
People from Wilmington, North Carolina
United States Attorneys for the Eastern District of North Carolina
University of North Carolina alumni
University of North Carolina School of Law alumni